The 2006 Michigan gubernatorial election was one of the 36 U.S. gubernatorial elections held November 7, 2006. Incumbent Democratic Governor of Michigan Jennifer Granholm was re-elected with 56% of the vote over Republican businessman Dick DeVos and three minor party candidates.

Democratic primary
Granholm had no opposition in the primary election, which was held August 8. She retained incumbent Lieutenant Governor John D. Cherry as her running mate.

Republican primary
DeVos was originally facing two other Republicans; state Representative Jack Hoogendyk of Portage and state Senator Nancy Cassis of Novi, both dropped out by summer 2005.  A political unknown, Louis Boven, tried to challenge him in the primary, but failed to meet Michigan election requirements to get on the ballot. Boven later ran an unsuccessful write-in campaign.

DeVos selected former State Representative and Oakland County Clerk Ruth Johnson as his running mate on August 14.

Minor parties

Candidates

Libertarian Party
The Libertarian Party of Michigan held their convention on May 16 at the Comfort Inn in Chelsea. The party nominated Gregory Creswell, with Scotty Boman as his running mate.

Green Party
The Green Party of Michigan had their convention at the Wolverine Dilworth Inn in Boyne City, Michigan. The Green Party's nominee was Douglas Campbell. His running mate was David Skrbina, a philosophy professor at the University of Michigan–Dearborn. Campbell, a registered professional engineer from Ferndale, joined the Green party upon learning of its existence in 2000, and was the Wayne-Oakland-Macomb county campaign coordinator for Green Party presidential candidate Ralph Nader, 2000.

Constitution Party
The Constitution Party's candidate was Bhagwan Dashairya, a member of the US Taxpayers' Party. The Michigan US Taxpayers' Party is affiliated with the United States Constitution Party, but Michigan election law does not provide a mechanism for changing the name of a political party. Dashairya was the first Asian Indian to run for Governor of Michigan. Dashairya's running mate was Carl Oehling.

General election 

After her first election as governor in 2002, Granholm was widely seen as a rising star in the Democratic Party. Her popularity dropped after she took office in 2003, largely due to a weak economy and high unemployment. In August 2006, her approval rating was 47 percent.

DeVos, a multimillionaire, had developed substantial political contacts with the full participation of his wife, former Michigan Republican Party chair Betsy DeVos, despite which, fully 85% of the DeVos campaign's contributions were from DeVos' inheritance.  As the 2006 election approached, the DeVos family was listed among the biggest Republican campaign contributors in Michigan. The DeVos campaign spent $42.5 million, at that time the most spent on a gubernatorial campaign in Michigan history. $35.5 million of that total came from DeVos' personal fortune, and was at that time the most spent personally by a Republican candidate running for governor. The Granholm campaign spent $15.7 million.  The combined money spent by both campaigns made this election the most expensive gubernatorial election in Michigan history. As DeVos funded his campaign himself, he was not eligible for public funds.

The DeVos and Campbell campaigns each made the state's economy their major issue. DeVos criticized the Single Business Tax, high unemployment, and job outsourcing which occurred during Granholm's first term; Campbell assailed the $12 billion taken from Michigan's taxpayers and appropriated to the military siege of Iraq (which he calls "Duh-bya's Folly") and advocated for a local currency, independent of the U.S. dollar which he and running mate David Skrbina say is in imminent jeopardy of collapse. Granholm countered that her policies saved thousands of jobs. She also attacked DeVos's partisanship, wealth, and tenure at Alticor.  One of Granholm's most prominent lines of attack was the accusation that Alticor, under DeVos's tenure, outsourced thousands of jobs to China while cutting 1,400 jobs in Michigan, a charge that the DeVos campaign and numerous media factcheckers denied.  DeVos, Campbell and Granholm criticized the Michigan Civil Rights Initiative which was exclusively supported by Creswell. and passed by a wide margin.

On August 25, 2006, Detroit Mayor Kwame Kilpatrick pledged to actively campaign for Granholm and utilize the campaign team which got him re-elected as mayor.
The Michigan Democratic Party held their state convention in city of Detroit at Cobo Hall while the Michigan Republican Party held their convention in the City of Novi in Oakland County at the new Rock Financial Showplace.

In October 2006, the Creswell campaign spent over $10,000 on radio advertising, which while small, was the most spent on a such advertising by any Michigan gubernatorial campaign outside the Democratic or Republican parties.  The largest investment was made in advertisements on Detroit AM Radio stations WJR and WXYT. These commercials specifically targeted Devos and Granholm by referring to them as candidates of "The two old parties," and berating them for supporting state-supported preferences based on race and sex:  A clear reference to MCRI. Campbell spent less than $1,000, as was the case with the Dashairya campaign.

Debates
The DeVos and Granholm campaigns agreed to three televised debates and a single joint appearance. This agreement did not include any provision for participation by third-party candidates. Granholm and DeVos appeared together October 12 at the Detroit Economic Club in which each candidate delivered their job plans.

WKAR-TV debate
The first debate occurred on October 2 at WKAR-TV in East Lansing. Both candidates spent the hour trading charges and countercharges. Detroit News pollster Ed Sarpolus indicated that there was no clear winner in the debate, but Bill Rustem, senior vice president of the nonpartisan policy firm Public Sector Consultants in Lansing, favored Granholm.  The consensus of pundits Bill Ballenger, George Bullard, Kathy Barks Hoffman and Rick Albin and capital correspondent Tim Skubick, speaking on the October 6 WKAR-television program Off the Record, was that both DeVos and Granholm emerged losers, losing 2 and 4 percentage points' support after the event.  No major gaffes or zingers came out in the debate.  Some of the positions were made clear on embryonic stem cell research  and abortion.  No major gaffes came out in the debate, but one minor zinger was made by Granholm about DeVos' investment in Alterra, a chain of nursing homes which sexually abused and neglected its patients.

WOOD-TV debate
The second was October 10 at WOOD-TV in Grand Rapids. DeVos was more aggressive than before, declaring that Granholm had lied about him having a controlling stake in Alterra Health Care, an elder-care company that suppressed information about the abuse of residents by its employees. According to  SEC filings, DeVos and his investment partners jointly owned 40% of Alterra stock totalling $173 million. The chairman of Alterra's board, while a close associate of DeVos, nevertheless maintains that DeVos had no part of running the company himself.

DeVos also asserted that he had convinced President Bush to set a date to meet with the three major Michigan auto companies. Granholm responded that she didn't believe that was true.  DeVos admitted after the debate that he misspoke; the President agreed to have a meeting at some point after the election, but did not confirm a date. On October 24, two weeks after this debate was held, a mid-November date was set for the meeting.

WXYZ-TV debate
The third televised debate was October 16 at WXYZ-TV in Southfield.  Unlike the previous debates, this one had an invited studio audience of 30 undecided voters, some of whom asked questions to the participating candidates. Like the two previous debates, only two of the five candidates were admitted.  Granholm and DeVos sparred on various issues including college tuition, Canadian trash, business taxes, President Bush and negative ads, while Creswell supporters picketed outside.

During the opening statements of the third debate, Gov. Granholm attacked DeVos for using pictures of dead children as a campaign tool against her. However, it was later revealed that DeVos was not the person using the pictures, but supporters of him, who were cheering for him outside of the debate studio.

CMN-TV (of Troy) debate
On October 18 CMN-TV in Troy broadcast an additional debate. This debate was not covered by the agreement between the DeVos and Granholm campaigns.  It was the only televised debate to which all gubernatorial candidates were invited.  It also was only the only televised debate in which the majority of gubernatorial candidates participated.  This debate included Libertarian Gregory Creswell, Green Douglas Campbell, and U.S. Taxpayer Candidate Bhagwan Dashairya (Dashairya identified himself as a Constitution Party (listed on ballot as U.S. Taxpayers Party) candidate).

Predictions

Polling
DeVos, buoyed by the political ads he ran, led in the polls for most of the late spring and early summer.  DeVos' lead eroded when Granholm started running ads; meanwhile, Granholm built up a lead as voters found out more about the candidates culminating in the three debates, and as political fortunes soured for Republicans across the country due to a massive backlash against then president George W. Bush and fatigue over the continuing War in Iraq.

Results

See also
2006 United States gubernatorial elections

References

External links
See Dick and Jen Run by Tim Skubick from the University of Michigan Press
Granholm for Governor campaign Website
DeVos for Governor campaign Website
Campbell for Governor campaign Website
Dashairya for Governor campaign Website

Governor
2006
Michigan